The Glasson Dock Branch Line was a railway line in Lancashire, England. Opened in 1883, this 5-mile branch line connected Glasson Dock to the UK rail network at Lancaster, with stations at Glasson Dock, Conder Green and at a private halt, Ashton Hall railway station. Passenger and freight services were provided, and its success came from transporting goods from the dock at Glasson and from St Georges Quay in Lancaster.

History, operation and decline
Glasson Dock was taking in 10,000 tons a day by 1830, with ships from the Isle of Man and elsewhere. So, it was decided a branch line would be built so ship-brought cargo could be transported by rail. There was a goods shed after Lancaster, which was where a separate, shorter line (St George's Quay branch) joined the railway. Due to its low-lying nature, the line was prone to flooding. The dock slowly declined though, and the goods services finally stopped in September 1964. Passenger services left Lancaster Castle Station on the westside down-bay platform, but they ceased in July 1930.

The route today
The route is easily traceable, leaving the West Coast Main Line just before the Carlisle Bridge. It is now a much-used cycleway, starting at the Lune Millennium Bridge in Lancaster, that forms part of the larger Bay Cycle Way. Conder Green Station is still visible, as is the halt at Ashton Hall, though the one at Glasson Dock has been demolished.

References 

Closed railway lines in North West England
Historic transport in Lancashire
Railway lines opened in 1883
Railway lines closed in 1964

London and North Western Railway
Rail transport in Lancashire
History of Lancaster
Transport in the City of Lancaster